Eulechria encratodes is a species of moth in the family Gelechioidea that occurs in Australia.

References

 
 

Oecophorinae
Moths of Australia
Moths described in 1884
Taxa named by Edward Meyrick